Nicole Tomczak-Jaegermann FRSC (8 June 1945 – 17 June 2022) was a Polish-Canadian mathematician, a professor of mathematics at the University of Alberta, and the holder of the Canada Research Chair in Geometric Analysis.

Contributions

Her research is in geometric functional analysis, and is unusual in combining asymptotic analysis with the theory of Banach spaces and infinite-dimensional convex bodies. It formed a key component of Fields medalist Timothy Gowers' solution to Stefan Banach's homogeneous space problem, posed in 1932. Her 1989 monograph on Banach–Mazur distances is also highly cited.

Education and career
Tomczak-Jaegermann earned her M.S. in 1968 from the University of Warsaw, and her Ph.D. from the same university in 1974, under the supervision of Aleksander Pełczyński. She remained on the faculty at the University of Warsaw from 1975 until 1983, when she moved to Alberta.

Recognition
In 1996, Tomczak-Jaegermann was elected to the Royal Society of Canada, and in 1999 she won the Krieger–Nelson Prize for an outstanding female Canadian mathematician. In 1998 she was an Invited Speaker of the International Congress of Mathematicians in Berlin. She was the winner of the 2006 CRM-Fields-PIMS prize for exceptional research in mathematics.

Death
Tomczak-Jaegermann died on 17 June 2022 at the age 77 in Edmonton, Alberta, Canada.

References

External links
Home page at the University of Alberta

1945 births
2022 deaths
People from Paris
Functional analysts
Polish mathematicians
Polish women mathematicians
Canadian women mathematicians
Canadian mathematicians
Canadian people of Polish descent
Canada Research Chairs
University of Warsaw alumni
Texas A&M University faculty
Academic staff of the University of Alberta
Fellows of the Royal Society of Canada